Mansour Bahrami and Fabrice Santoro were the defending champions, but Bahrami competed in the Legends Over 45 Doubles event. Santoro played alongside Sébastien Grosjean, but they were eliminated in the round-robin stage.

Juan Carlos Ferrero and Carlos Moyá won the title, defeating Arnaud Clément and Nicolas Escudé in the final, 6–3, 6–3.

Draw

Final

Group A
Standings are determined by: 1. number of wins; 2. number of matches; 3. in three-players-ties, percentage of sets won, or of games won; 4. steering-committee decision.

Group B
Standings are determined by: 1. number of wins; 2. number of matches; 3. in three-players-ties, percentage of sets won, or of games won; 4. steering-committee decision.

References
Main Draw

Legends Under 45 Doubles